The 2007–08 season of the Norwegian Premier League, the highest volleyball league for women in Norway.

League table

References

Volleyball competitions in Norway
Volley
Volley
2007 in volleyball
2008 in volleyball